North Close is a village in County Durham, England, between Spennymoor and Kirk Merrington and south of Durham.

External links

Villages in County Durham
Spennymoor